Valladolid is a province of northwest Spain, in the central part of the autonomous community of Castile and León.

The capital is the city of Valladolid. It is bordered by the provinces of Zamora, León, Palencia, Burgos, Segovia, Ávila, and Salamanca. It is thus the only Spanish province surrounded entirely by other provinces of the same autonomous community. It is the only peninsular province which has no mountains.

Because the extensive plain on which the province lies is strategically important to overland transport, it is a major communications hub. From a national point of view it connects Madrid with the north of Spain, from Vigo in Galicia to San Sebastián in the Basque Country, and from an international point of view, it is on the shortest land route connecting Porto in the north of Portugal with Hendaye in the south of France.

The cuisine of the province is like that of Castile—meats and roasts occupy a central place. One of the most typical dishes is lechazo, a dish made from unweaned lambs, similar to veal. Suckling pig, black pudding, sausages, and sheep's milk cheeses are also traditional. The province has five wines with a denomination of origin.

The province once served as the capital of the Castilian court and the former capital of the Empire during the reigns of Emperor Carlos I, Philip II and Philip III, which explains why to this day it remains pregnant with castles and strongholds. The capital has an important historical – artistic heritage and one of the more important museums of sculpture of Europe. The province of Valladolid is specially famous for its processions of Holy Week, as much in the capital as in the localities of Medina de Rioseco and Medina del Campo. In addition, the province has two UNESCO world heritage sites within its category Memory of the World Programme: the Treaty of Tordesillas and the Archivo General de Simancas.

History 

The province of Valladolid was established as such by the Royal Decree of 29 September 1833 driven by the minister Javier de Burgos, being attached to the historic region of Old Castile.

The first stable population that settled in the present province were the pre-Roman Vaccaei people (Spanish name: vacceos, the area that they inhabited is called "Region Vaccea") who belonged to a very advanced culture when the rest of the Celtic peoples arrived in the peninsula from the north of Europe (there is evidence that indicates that they also occupied territories corresponding to other provinces). By then, it was already defined for the chronicles as a region "free and discovered" and "an open country, wheat fields, deforested land" and the vacceos were involved in livestock farming and especially agriculture (cereals). In the year 178 BC, the Romans conquered the territory. Thus the lands that make up the current province came under their occupation, up to the barbarian invasions of the early fifth century AD when the province came under the control of the new Visigothic Kingdom.

After the invasion of the Iberian peninsula by the Muslims in the year 711, the Muslims arrived in these lands just a year later, in 712. Later, during the Reconquista, this area was the subject of battles between the Muslims and the Christian Kingdom of León in the first half of the eleventh century. In 939, after the Battle of Simancas clinched the domain of the basin of the Douro river by the Christian kingdoms. Valladolid was founded in the year 1072 by Count Pedro Ansúrez. From here its history was linked to that of the Crown of Castile. In fact, cities such as Medina del Campo or Valladolid became important administrative centers Castilians and also experienced an economic boom (mesta, fairs ... ). Had a great importance in the Discovery of the Americas in 1492 (Christopher Columbus will end up living the last years of his life until his death in 1506 in Valladolid) and the subsequent colonization with explorers such as Juan Ponce de León -discoverer of the Florida (United States)-. In fact, in some houses of Tordesillas, was signed the Treaty of Tordesillas which decided to the cast of the New World between the Catholic Monarchs and the Kingdom of Portugal giving rise to Latin America.

The revolt of the comuneros in the year 1520, which ended with the ringleaders of that revolt publicly executed in Villalar de los Comuneros. Valladolid became the capital of the Spanish empire between the years 1601–1606. When the Spanish Empire began to decline due to the continuing wars in which this involved and the emergence of new emerging powers, there was an economic decline in the area, as in the rest of the Spanish monarchy. During the War of the Spanish Succession (1700–1715) It positioned the side of the Bourbon pretender, that would be the one who got the throne. In the Peninsular War against France (1808–1814), there were a succession of small battles and the continued action of guerrillas as "The Undaunted".

In the Spanish Civil War (1936–1939) Valladolid was the "most significant regional nucleus" of Falangism in the Spanish Second Republic, garnering the second-highest provincial vote for the party in the otherwise dismal (for Falangists) elections of 1936, just behind Cadiz. The province was controlled by Franco's Nationalists throughout the Civil War. During the Franco period there was an exodus from the rural countryside to the industrial cities.  A further exodus occurred with the arrival of democracy in Spain (early 1980s), when the province was made part of the new autonomous community of Castile and Leon. Start a process of economic growth that peaked with the Spanish property bubble and then suffers from the economic crisis of 2008-2015, like the rest of the south of Europe.

Nowadays it is one of the best provinces in the country in terms of health, education, security, cultural and linguistic heritage and economy (ranking fifth in its index of convergence with the European Union).

Economy 

The per capita GDP of the province is €24,751 per year in 2010 (more or less $32,176). If you take the Spanish average as an index with value 100, the province obtained a 109% over this index so exceed the national per capita GDP. The total GDP of the province amounted to €13,000,403,000 (more or less $16.900 billion).

Agriculture dedicated to the cultivation of cereals (wheat and barley), legumes, sugar beets, alfalfa, vegetables and vines. Important livestock. Intense industrial activity especially concentrated in the capital, derived from agriculture (pasta, flour, chocolate, sugar, etc. ), textiles, metallurgy, automobile manufacturing (FASA-Renault), chemical, construction, paper, graphic arts, etc. In addition to the capital city Valladolid, stand out the populations of Medina del Campo, Peñafiel, Tordesillas, Tudela de Duero, Laguna de Duero, Íscar, Olmedo and Pedrajas de San Esteban (this last, due to its large production of pine nut)

The top 10 companies by economic billing in 2013 were: Renault-España, Michelin, Iveco, El Árbol, Aquagest (Grupo Agbar), Lauki (Lactalis), Begar, ACOR, Grupo Norte and Queserías Entrepinares.

Government and politics 

The Valladolid Province was established as such by the Royal Decree of 29 October 1833 driven by the minister Javier de Burgos as the rest of provinces of the country (see: 1833 territorial division of Spain). To do this took into account the common historic, cultural and economic characteristics of each territory.

The Government and the administration of the province of Valladolid corresponds to the Provincial Council of Valladolid, as outlined in the statute of autonomy of Castilla and Leon. Headquarters is located in the Palacio of Pimentel of Valladolid, since 1875, when the building was purchased by the Provincial Government.

Political divisions 

Today, the province does not have official divisions, but historically it has been divided into 8 comarcas (a Spanish term for shires):
 Tierra de Campos ("Land of Fields")
 Montes Torozos ("Torozos Mountains")
 Campiña del Pisuerga ("The Pisuerga Countryside")
 Páramos del Esgueva ("Esgueva's Moorland")
 Tierra del Vino ("Land of wine")
 Tierra de Pinares ("Land of Pine")
 Campo de Peñafiel ("Peñafiel Field")
 Tierra de Medina ("Land of Medina")

Geography 

It is bordered by the provinces of Burgos, Palencia and Leon to the north, with Zamora, to the west; with the provinces of Salamanca and Avila to the south; and with the province of Segovia to the east. It is, therefore, the only Spanish province surrounded only – and entirely – by others in your same autonomous community (Castile and León).

The highest point is in Castrillo de Duero and is the Cuchillejos hill (933 m). The lowest point is the Douro river passing by Villafranca de Duero (626 m).

Climate 

The Continental Mediterranean climate is typical of Meseta Central, which is located in the province of Valladolid. It is similar to the typical Mediterranean but with characteristics of continental climates, of more extreme temperatures, although it does not go to be as different as to be classified separately. In addition this climate does not receive the influence of the sea, that is why the temperatures are the most extreme of Spain, with a lot of heat summers and winters quite cold with a swing of 18.5 Cº.

Summer is the driest season and can overcome with great frequency 30 °C, reaching sporadically over 35 °C. However, in winter it is frequent that the temperatures fall to 0 °C, producing ice in cloudless nights and snow sporadically. When frost combines with fog, that is called hard rime, a very characteristic phenomenon of the area, like frost. This northern region of Spain, along with the rest of the provinces of Castile and Leon, is the coldest region in South Europe. Rainfall follows a very similar pattern to that of the typical Mediterranean climate, reaching between 400 and 600 mm, with a peak during Spring and Autumn. The declining influence of the sea, however, makes it a drier climate than the typical.

Nature 

 Nature Reserve Banks of Castronuño: (Reserva Natural de las Riberas de Castronuño-Vega del Duero in Spanish) In the shire of Torozo's Mountains, is an area of moorland and Las Vegas sedimented. A migratory and nesting area for waterbirds. The Duero is surrounded by forests of Ribera and constitutes a very interesting swamp ecosystem. It is an area of great plains and absence of high elevations. The fauna is abundant, such as heron, martinete, common egret, snakes, ducks spoons, porrores common pochards, tufted ducks, cormorants, albotan, osprey, snake necklace, eagle of ladder, heron, peregrine falcon, lizards and colirroja Cinderella, ocelad lizard, frog of San Antonio, toads birth attendants, polecats, badger. The nature reserve is considered a Special Protection Area for Birds.
 Canal of Castile: (Canal de Castilla in Spanish) Construction started in 1753 and it took almost a century to complete since it was opened in 1849. It is shaped like a "Y" upside down and its purpose was the transport of the wheat of Castile toward the ports of the Cantabrian Sea but the arrival of the railroad soon made him become obsolete. Crosses 9 municipalities in the province.With the passage of time, in the margins of the channel have been forming a series of wetlands of high ecological value, representing an island of biodiversity. Its high ecological value is related to its diverse aquatic vegetation and with the large number of vertebrate species that are hosting them. Within the birds, in the channel there are 121 species of nesting birds and also wintering birds and birds hydrosphere and accidental; 42 species of mammals, 15 of them insectivorous; 11 species of amphibians and 14 reptiles and 14 species of fish.

Flora and vegetation 
Vegetation is typical of plateau (700–800 meters above sea level), with various species of pine (pinus pinea and pinus pinaster), holm oak (quercus ilex), oak (quercus pyrenaica and quercus faginea), Cork oak (quercus suber), elms, poplars, fraxinus, willows, alders, populus, honeysuckles carrizos, steeples, bush and pastures.

Fauna 
In general, animals found in the area are that of a typical Mediterranean plateau, such as: European rabbit, red squirrel, European hedgehog, common vole, partridge, little and great bustards, white stork, barn swallow, European robin, common cuckoo, common nightingale, common woodpigeon, Eurasian magpie, mallard, greylag goose, Spanish and House sparrows, Perez's frog, Montagu's harrier, western marsh harrier, hen harrier, peregrine falcon, short-toed snake eagle, lesser kestrel, common crane, pin-tailed sandgrouse, Geoffroy's bat, trout, common carp, crayfish, Eurasian otter, shrew, Iberian hare, roe deer, wild boar, red fox and grey wolf.

Demography

Population trends

Demographic Indicators

Number of people 
Valladolid is the most populated province of de Castile and León, with 520,716 people in 2020 (INE), representing more than 20% of the total population of the community. It has 1.1% of the national population and is the 19th most populous province.

It has one of the few growing populations in Castile and León and also one of the youngest. The population is also characterized by being one of the most long-lived of Spain and Europe.

Structure of the population 

Most of the population of Valladolid, 65.4%, is between 16 and 64 years ( INE 2006). 17.7% are aged 65 years or more and 16.9% are children or adolescents.

Total Population of the province (2007)
 Men:    255,983 (49,07%)
 Women:  265,678 (50,93%)
 Total:  521,661

Nº people by age

0–20 years: 22.379 = 16,91%
20–40 years: 20.911 = 30,82%
40–60 years: 21.125 = 28,7%
over 60 years: 23.762 = 23,57%

Most populous municipalities 

The twenty most populated municipalities in the province of Valladolid are the following ( INE of 2014):

Taking into account that the population of Valladolid, Laguna de Duero, Medina del Campo and Arroyo de la Encomienda represent almost 75% of the total of the 23 municipalities in the metropolitan area of Valladolid, there is a clear demographic contrast with highly depopulated areas of a marked rural character; among the more uninhabited areas of the province are Aguasal, Torrecilla de la Torre, Almenara Adaja, San Salvador, and Fontihoyuelo, which do not exceed the 40 registered inhabitants.

Immigration 

Immigrants in Valladolid represent 4,81% of the population. Today immigrants with a residence card in Valladolid number 25,324.

Patrimony 

 

The province has a total of 188 monuments considered as objects of Cultural Interest. A large part of them are castles, churches and historical sites, although there are also archaeological sites or files. In the case of the churches and monasteries are wide variety of architectural styles, including the preromanesque, romanesque, gothic, renaissance and baroque.

Castles of Valladolid 
The province of Valladolid is one of the European regions with more castles and that they are being improved for the use and enjoyment of all people. The importance of the castles in this territory was such that it have an own type of model called escuela de Valladolid ("School of Valladolid"). These are the preserved castles in the province of Valladolid:

 Castromembibre Castle (Castromembibre)
 Peñafiel Castle (Peñafiel)
 Curiel de Duero Castle-Palace, (Curiel de Duero)
 Curiel de Duero Castle, (Curiel de Duero)
 Canillas de Esgueva Castle (Canillas de Esgueva)
 Encinas de Esgueva Castle (Encinas de Esgueva)
 Foncastín Castle (Foncastín)
 Fuensaldaña Castle(Fuensaldaña)
 Fuente el Sol Castle (Fuente el Sol)
 Íscar Castle (Íscar)
 La Mota Castle (Medina del Campo)
 Mota del Marqués Castle (Mota del Marqués)
 Montealegre Castle (Montealegre)
 Mucientes Castle (Mucientes)
 Portillo Castle (Portillo)
 San Pedro de Latarce Castle (San Pedro de Latarce)
 Tiedra Castle (Tiedra)
 Tordehumos Castle (Tordehumos)
 Castle of Torrelobatón (Torrelobatón)
 Trigueros del Valle Castle (Trigueros del Valle)
 Urueña Castle (Urueña)
 Villafuerte de Esgueva Castle (Villafuerte de Esgueva)
 Villagarcia de Campos Castle (Villagarcia de Campos)
 Villavellid Castle (Villavellid)
 Simancas Castle (Simancas)
 Castroverde de Cerrato Castle (Castroverde de Cerrato)
 Villalba de los Alcores Castle (Villalba de los Alcores)
 Barcial de la Loma Castle (Barcial de la Loma)
 Alaejos Castle (Alaejos)
 Pozaldez Castle (Pozaldez)
 San Martín de Valvení Castle (San Martín de Valvení)
 Eván de Abajo Castle (Siete Iglesias de Trabancos)
 Eván de Arriba Castle (Siete Iglesias de Trabancos)
 Alderete Palace-Castle (Tordesillas)
 Villagómez la Nueva Castle (Villagómez la Nueva)

Walls 

 Walls of Cigales (Cigales)
 Walls of Curiel de Duero (Curiel de Duero)
 Walls of Mayorga (Mayorga)
 Walls of Medina de Rioseco (Medina de Rioseco)
 Walls of Medina del Campo (Medina del Campo)
 Walls of Olmedo (Olmedo)
 Walls of Peñafiel (Peñafiel)
 Walls of Portillo (Portillo)
 Walls of Tordesillas (Tordesillas)
 Walls of Torrelobatón (Torrelobatón)
 Walls of Tudela de Duero (Tudela de Duero)
 Walls of Urueña (Urueña)
 Walls of Valbuena de Duero (Valbuena de Duero)
 Walls of Valladolid (Valladolid)
 Walls of Villabrágima (Villabrágima)
 Walls of Villalba de los Alcores (Villalba de los Alcores)

Monasteries 
The monasteries are another of the most important cultural heritages of the province. Some of them are in perfect condition and others are only preserved ruins. Some of the most important are

Gastronomy 

The gastronomy of the Valladolid province is typically Spanish, although each area presents a different picture. In the northern area of the province, especially in the region of Tierra de Campos ("Land of Fields"), is the development of traditional sheep's cheese, among which is the cheese of Villalón de Campos, curing or cured; it is a fresh cheese also known as pata de mulo ("mule's leg"). They are also the usual garlic soup, stew developed slowly in stew to the Firelight, the lentils stewed elaborated with the variety pardina own of Tierra de Campos and pigeon or palomino made with different techniques. Within the typical cakes include the rolls of the Virgin of the sources used in Villalon of fields, the donuts of palo, appendages, oil cakes and greaves. In Medina de Rioseco you can taste the traditional sugared almonds or marinas, puff pastry cream filling and covered with sugar.

Wine 

Wines from the province of Valladolid are among the best in the world due to its taste and quality. An example of the fame of these wines is due to Vega Sicilia winery. The province has 5 wines with denomination of Origin. Wines of Rueda Denomination of Origin were considered as the wines of the court at the time of the Catholic Monarchs. For its elaboration is used the range of verdejo grape and to a lesser measure both the Sauvignon blanc. Under this appellation wines there are white, sparkling, reds, pink and liquor. For their part, the wines of Ribera del Duero are elaborated with the ink on the country and you can taste red wines young, reserve wine and old vine. Wines of the Toro Designation of Origin are mainly white, rosé and red, the wines of Tierra de León Denomination of Origin are white, rosé and red and finally, there are the rosé of the Cigales denomination of Origin.

Meat 

The province is also famous due its meats, mainly lechazo (veal or lamb), suckling pig, steaks, meat chops, veal ribs, pork ribs, black pudding, or embutidos. There are numerous restaurants that specialize in lechazo and feature hornos de leña (wood-fired ovens or wooden stoves), in which the lamb is roasted. The typical restaurant where the meat is traditionally cooked is called mesón castellano (Castilian tavern).

Bread 

Bread made in the province of Valladolid has a great tradition that goes back to the ninth century (see also: History of bread). In fact, Holy Roman Emperor Charles V, during their retreat in the monastery of Yuste, made him get the bread in Valladolid and during the 16th century the master bakers members were financially supported by the Crown.

The typically Castilian bread receives the name of "Candeal bread", "sobao o bregado" ("sobao or labored"), because since remote times in Castile the wheat variety most used is the durum. It is a thin crust of bread and lightly toast, miga very white and compact with a fine texture and distinctive flavor. This type of bread is suitable to accompany red meats, stews or legumes accompanied by wines from the province. Traditionally it is made by hand, with an amassed slow fermentation and a prolonged, finished cooking in the wood-fired oven.

Under this denomination, fall different varieties; among them the most prominent is the variety of "lechuguino bread", characterized by its typical drawing and care that gives the name to the variety, since it was formerly known as, especially in rural areas, "lechuguino" to those people who were overly arranged.

Other varieties are the typical bread of four beds, with a characteristic splitting of the earth on which the central part is separated from the four masons or edges, the bread of tables, the bread of pulley, with a slit made with a string that imitates a pulley, the white bar or peaks and the Fabiola, created in 1961 by a baker from Valladolid in honor of Queen Fabiola of Belgium.

Other types not so traditional in the province but very consumed in the zone are the rustic bar and the bar of flame, that in Valladolid takes the common name of toolbar riche.

Culture 

The Provincial government is developing a program called "Cultural Travel" with the intention of bringing the population not only of Valladolid but of all Spain the rich collection of the historical province and the rich cultural heritage of the province of Valladolid to know and be able to learn, to understand, appreciate and enjoy this legacy (castles, palaces, churches, museums, gastronomy...). The province is one of the most advanced in terms of museums taking some of the most important of Castile and Leon and of Spain.

Holy Week holds ("Semana Santa" in Spanish) one of the best known Catholic traditions in the province. Is the annual commemoration of the Passion of Jesus Christ celebrated by Catholic religious brotherhoods and fraternities that perform penance processions on the streets of each city and town during the last week of Lent, the week immediately before Easter.

Easter is one of the most spectacular and emotional fiestas in Valladolid. Religious devotion, art, colour and music combine in acts to commemorate the death of Jesus Christ: the processions. Members of the different Easter brotherhoods, dressed in their characteristic robes, parade through the streets carrying religious statues (pasos) to the sound of drums and music – scenes of sober beauty.

Seminci ("Valladolid International Film Festival" in English) is a film festival held annually in Valladolid since 1956. Is one of the foremost (and oldest) film festival. The festival has always been characterised by its willingness to take risks and to innovate in its programming.  It has also been keen to critically examine each new school or movement as it has arisen, whether it be German, Polish, Chinese, Canadian or otherwise. With a genuine concern for the art of cinema, for film-making and film-makers rather than the more obvious commercial or glamorous aspects of the industry, the festival has built up an identity of its own – equally attractive to enthusiasts, professionals and the media.

The National Sculpture Museum has more than 1,500 sculptures and 1,200 paintings from Middle Ages until the beginning of the 19th century, as well as a number of high-quality paintings (Rubens, Zurbarán or Melendez, among others). Sculptural collection is the most important Spanish of the Peninsula and one of the most prominent European of this thematic area.

The museum exposes many national sculptures, and some in Europe, as well as some paintings, ranging from the 13th to 19th centuries of Iberian Peninsula and the former territorial areas linked to Spain (Latin America, Flanders and Italy). Painters are present as Bononi, Rubens, Zurbarán, Ribalta or Melendez, but the center of your collection corresponds to sculptures dating back from the 15th to 17th centuries.

The Unesco was awarded the distinction of World Heritage Site within its category Memory of the World Programme at the Treaty of Tordesillas in 2007 and Archivo General de Simancas in 2017.

Languages 
Spanish is the only official language throughout the territory. Valladolid stands out for having been the residence of the author of Don Quixote, Miguel de Cervantes, as well as authors such as José Zorrilla or Miguel Delibes and the thrust of its University. The province stands out for receiving a significant number of people who want to learn the Spanish language (Language tourism).

Sports 

Valladolid has professional teams in four sports: football (soccer), basketball, handball and rugby. In football Real Valladolid is an historic team of the Spanish Liga. In basketball CB Ciudad de Valladolid replaces the original CB Valladolid (which featured players such as Arvydas Sabonis, Oscar Schmidt, John Williams, Ed O'Bannon and Panagiotis Vasilopoulos) following the older team's bankruptcy. In handball, BM Atlético Valladolid replaced BM Valladolid (winner of two King's Cups, one ASOBAL Cup and one EHF Cup Winners' Cup). There is also a women's handball team, BM Aula Cultural. Valladolid is also known as a national center for rugby, with two of the top teams of the league División de Honor de Rugby: CR El Salvador and Valladolid RAC, which between the two have won nineteen National League Championships, thirteen King's Cups and fourteen Spanish Supercups.

Transport 
The province of Valladolid has a great strategic importance because it is an important communications hub. From the national point of view, is the track that connects Madrid with all the north of Spain, from Vigo (Galicia) until San Sebastián (Basque Country). From the international point of view, here goes the shortest land route that connects Portugal with France, from the north of Portugal (Porto) to the south of France (Hendaye).

Roads

Railways

The path of the Spanish High Speed (AVE) stops in the town of Valladolid as part of the Madrid–Valladolid high-speed rail line. This line was inaugurated on 22 December 2007. It is expected that in the future other localities such as Olmedo and Medina del Campo have another high-speed lines that are at different stages of project like Olmedo-Zamora-Galicia high-speed rail line or Valladolid-Palencia-León high-speed rail line.

There is one publicly owned railway company operating: the Spanish national Renfe that operates long-distance and high speed rail services (AVE, Avant and Talgo).

Airports

The province has one airport; the Valladolid Airport, located in Villanubla, which handled 223,587 passengers, 4,388 aircraft movements and 21.7 tons of cargo in 2014. Has become one of the core subjects of passengers of Castile and León. Has travel to destinations such as Alicante, Barcelona, Palma de Mallorca, Ibiza, Menorca, Gran Canaria, Tenerife South, Lanzarote, Valencia, Malaga.

Also there are number of small private airfields.

Municipalities

References

External links 

Valladolid Province Tourism Board official Website
Spain's Tourism Board official Website